Juan Rafael Esposito-Garcia (born January 10, 1974) is an Argentinian priest of the Catholic Church who serves as auxiliary bishop for the Archdiocese of Washington.

Biography
On June 14, 2008, Esposito-Garcia was ordained to the priesthood. Pope Francis appointed Esposito-Garcia auxiliary bishop for the Archdiocese of Washington on December 19, 2022.    On February 21, 2023, Esposito-Garcia was consecrated as a bishop.

See also

 Catholic Church hierarchy
 Catholic Church in the United States
 Historical list of the Catholic bishops of the United States
 List of Catholic bishops of the United States
 Lists of patriarchs, archbishops, and bishops

References

External links
Roman Catholic Archdiocese of Washington Official Site

Episcopal succession

 

1974 births 
Living people
American Roman Catholic priests
Bishops appointed by Pope Francis